Associação Desportiva de Lousada or simply AD Lousada is a Portuguese club, based in Lousada, district of Porto. The club has various sports, specially football, field hockey and basketball.

Football (soccer)

Appearances
II Divisão: 16	
III Divisão: 10	
Taça de Portugal: 26	
Taça da Liga: 0

League Cup and History
As of April 14, 2009

External links
A.D. Lousada Football Club web site

Football clubs in Portugal
Sport in Lousada
Sports clubs established in 1948
1948 establishments in Portugal
Association football clubs established in 1948
Portuguese field hockey clubs
Field hockey clubs established in 1948